Calcahualco is a city in the Mexican state of Veracruz.

It serves as the municipal seat for the Calcahualco Municipality.

The coffee grown in Calcahualco is famous.

External links 
  Municipal Official Site
  Municipal Official Information

References

Populated places in Veracruz

hola